Bârzava is a commune in Arad County, Romania. The commune Bârzava is situated at the foot of Zărand Mountains, at its contact point with Metaliferi Mountains, along the river Bârzava - a right tributary of the Mureș. It is composed of eight villages: Bârzava (situated at 61 km from Arad), Bătuța (Battuca), Căpruța (Kapruca), Dumbrăvița (Alsódombró), Groșii Noi (Garassa), Lalașinț (Lalánc), Monoroștia (Marosmonyoró) and Slatina de Mureș (Marosszlatina).

Population
According to the last census, the population of the commune counts 3019 inhabitants, out of which 98% are Romanians, 0.4% Hungarians, 1% Roma and 0.6% are of other or undeclared nationalities.

History
The first documentary record of the locality Bârzava dates back to 1471. Bătuța was mentioned in documents in 1851,
Căpruța in 1350, Dumbrăvița in 1471, Groșii Noi in 1515, Lalașinț in 1585, Monoroștia in 1350 and Slatina de Mureș in 1439.

Economy
The economic sectors are well represented at commune level. Besides agriculture, the industry of building materials and timber industry are present in significant proportion.

Tourism
The natural reservation Runcu-Groși (botanical reservation with an area of approx. 261.8 ha), the palaeontological reservation Monoroștia, the wooden church Presentation of Jesus, a historical
and architectural monument dating back to 1807, are the most important touristic sights of the commune.

References

Communes in Arad County
Localities in Crișana
Place names of Slavic origin in Romania